Far Beyond the World is the sixth studio album released by the hard rock band Ten in 2001. It was the last Ten album with the founding member guitarist Vinny Burns. The Asian version of the album has a different track listing.

Track listing
All songs written by Gary Hughes.

European Version (Frontiers Records FR CD 099)
 "Glimmer of Evil" - 5:48
 "Strange Land" - 5:13
 "High Tide" - 5:46
 "What About Me" - 5:34
 "Last of the Lovers" - 6:11
 "Outlawed and Notorious" - 6:37
 "Scarlet and the Grey" - 5:29
 "Heart Like a Lion" - 5:16
 "Black Shadows" - 5:29
 "Who Do You Want To Love" - 5:44
 "Far Beyond the World" - 5:09

Asian version (Victor Records VICP-61653)
 "Scarlet and the Grey" – 5:29
 "Strange Land" – 5:13
 "What About Me?" – 5:34
 "Glimmer of Evil" – 5:48
 "Last of the Lovers" – 6:11
 "Heart Like a Lion" – 5:16
 "Black Shadows" – 5:29
 "High Tide" – 5:46
 "Far Beyond the World" – 5:09
 "Who Do You Want to Love?" – 5:44
 "Outlawed and Notorious" – 6:37
Asian version (Victor Records VICP-61653) adds
"The Soldier" – 6:11

2016 japanese SHM-CD remaster (Avalon MICP-11299) adds
"In Love And War" - 4:47

Personnel
Gary Hughes – vocals 
Vinny Burns – lead guitars
John Halliwell – rhythm guitars
Steve McKenna – bass guitar
Paul Hodson – keyboards
Greg Morgan – drums

Production
Mixing – Tommy Newton
Engineer – Paulo Melo
Additional engineering – Audu Obaje, Ray Brophy, Vinny Burns and Gary Hughes

References

External links
Heavy Harmonies page
melodicrock.com review

Ten (band) albums
2001 albums
Albums produced by Gary Hughes
Frontiers Records albums